Théodore Sindikubwabo (1928 – March 1998) was the interim President of Rwanda during the genocide against Tutsis, from 9 April to 19 July 1994. Prior to that, he was President of the Rwandan legislature National Development Council from 1988–1994. 

Sindikubwabo was born in Zivu, Shyanda village, in the town of Butare, formerly called Astrida in Rwanda-Urundi Territory, and currently the southern province of Rwanda. His parents Zacharrie Semutwa and Judithe Nyiramanda were both from the Tutsi ethnic group. Sindikubwabo was educated as a physician and was Minister of Health in the administration of President Kayibanda.  Following the takeover by Juvénal Habyarimana, Sindikubwabo became a practising pediatrician in Kigali Central Hospital. He later returned to politics as a deputy in parliament.

Immediately following Habyarimana's assassination on 6 April 1994, Sindikubwabo was installed as interim President by the Crisis Committee controlled by Colonel Théoneste Bagosora, and he was the head of state during the genocide. Sindikubwabo is widely believed to have been a puppet of the group of military officers who held the real power.  On 19 April 1994, he made a now-infamous speech at the ceremony appointing a new Préfet (Governor) of Butare that was broadcast on national radio, in which he insulted those who were not "working", a euphemism for killing Tutsis, and told them to "get out of the way and let us work".  On 29 April, he returned to Butare and told the populace that he was there to supervise the killing of Tutsis. On 18 May, whilst on a visit to Kibuye Prefecture, he congratulated the people on how well they had done their "work".

Taking advantage of his medical knowledge, he advised the military to cut a certain vein on the jugular to cause certain death. 

Following the invasion of the Rwandan Patriotic Front that took control of the country and ended the genocide, Sindikubwabo fled to Zaire (now the Democratic Republic of the Congo), where he lived in exile in Bukavu. He was interviewed there for the book We Wish to Inform You That Tomorrow We Will Be Killed With Our Families and quoted as saying: "The moment has not yet come to say who is guilty and who is not guilty." He was initially reported to have been killed in the Rwandan government attack on Bukavu in November 1996 at the beginning of the First Congo War, but subsequent reports put him in Kinshasa. He died in exile in the Democratic Republic of the Congo in March 1998 and was never charged by the International Criminal Tribunal for Rwanda.

Footnotes

External links
Butare, an 'Intellectual' Town That Outdid Itself, Even in Genocide, 18 February 2005

1928 births
1998 deaths
Hutu people
Rwandan genocide perpetrators
Government ministers of Rwanda
Members of the Parliament of Rwanda
Rwandan exiles
Rwandan expatriates in the Democratic Republic of the Congo
People from Butare